Fobbing is a small village and former civil parish in Thurrock, Essex, England and one of Thurrock's traditional (Church of England) parishes. It is located between Basildon and Corringham, and is also close to Stanford-le-Hope. In 1931 the parish had a population of 734.

Fobbing is one of seven conservation areas in Thurrock.

History

The place-name Fobbing is first attested in the Domesday Book of 1086, where it appears as Phobinge. It appears as Fobinges in 1125, and Fobbinges in 1227. The name means "Fobba's people", Fobba being a shortened form of the name Folcheorht.

Fobbing was one of the main villages involved with the Peasants' Revolt. On 30 May 1381, the commissioner John Bampton summoned the Fobbing villagers, as well as villagers from Corringham and Stanford, to Brentwood to answer as to why they had not paid tax. The villagers told Bampton that they would give him nothing. Bampton then moved to arrest the villagers. A riot ensued in which the villagers attempted to kill Bampton, who managed to escape to London. Sir Robert Belknap was sent to investigate the incident and to punish the offenders. On 2 June, he was attacked. By this time the violent discontent had spread, and the counties of Essex and Kent were in full revolt. Soon people moved on London in an armed uprising. In 1981  a metal sculpture by B R Coode-Adams was erected as a memorial to the Peasants' Revolt at Fobbing to commemorate the 600th anniversary .

St. Michael's Church is renowned for its historic association with the smuggling trade. At one time the church was near the waterfront of Fobbing Harbour. Smugglers sailed up Fobbing Creek guided by the distinctive church tower but after the great flood of 1 February 1953, the creek and harbour were sealed up by a dyke and drained. Underneath the church there are claimed to be many tunnels which were used by smugglers in the 14th century.

On 1 April 1936 the parish was abolished to form Thurrock, part also went to Lee Chapel.

Public house

The White Lion public house is situated at the top of Lion Hill.

Notable people
 The mathematician John Pell was appointed rector here in 1661
 Thomas Baker (Peasants' Revolt leader) was born in Fobbing

Notes

External links

Villages in Essex
Populated places on the River Thames
Former civil parishes in Essex
Thurrock
Peasants' Revolt